List of people from the region of Calabria:

Notable Calabrians

 Achille Falcone (16th-century composer)
 Acrion (Pythagorean philosopher)
 Ada Dondini (actress)
 Adele Cambria (actress, journalist & writer)
 Agostino Li Vecchi (member of Italian basketball team at 2000 Olympics)
 Alba Florio (poetess)
 Alcmaeon of Croton (ancient philosopher/medical theorist who pioneered anatomical dissection)
 Alessandro De Rose (champion cliff diver)
 Alessandro Longo (19th-century composer & musicologist)
 Alexis (ancient comic poet)
 Alfonso Rendano (19th-century pianist & composer who invented the "third pedal")
 Alfredo Costanzo (Australian motor racing driver born in Calabria)
 Aloysius Lilius (16th-century astronomer who created the Gregorian Calendar)
 Amyris of Sybaris (consulted the Delphic oracle)
 Annalisa Insarda (film, television, theatre & voice actress)
 Andy Varipapa (professional bowler called "the greatest one-man bowling show on Earth")
 Angelo Arciglione (international prize-winning pianist)
 Angelo Maria Mazzia (19th-century artist & Knight of the Order of the Crown of Italy)
 Anna Barbaro (paralympic triathlete who won silver medal at the 2020 Summer Paralympics)
 Anna Maria Maiolino (artist)
 Anselmo Lorecchio (lawyer, journalist, politician, poet, writer & newspaper founder)
 Antonella Della Porta (film actress)
 Antonio Aiello (singer/songwriter)
 Antonio Cantafora (film & television actor)
 Antonio Diego Voci (figurative artist & sculptor)
 Antonio D'Oppido (champion swimmer)
 Antonio Fava (actor/director, comedian, musician & Maestro of Commedia dell'arte)
 Antonio Fuoco (motor racing driver)
 Antonio Maria Magro (actor, director & screenwriter)
 Antonio Porchia (poet)
 Antonio Pujía (artist & sculptor)
 Antonio Rodotà (former Director General of the European Space Agency)
 Antonio Serra (late 16th-century philosopher & economist)
 Antonio Siciliano (film editor)
 Antonio Strati (organizational theorist & artist)
 Antonio Tallura (actor & writer)
 Antony Carbone (film & television actor)
 Arignote (pythagorean philosopher)
 Aristomachus of Croton (ancient party leader of Croton during the Hannibalian war)
 Aroldo Tieri (actor)
 Astylos of Croton (ancient olympic athlete)
 Autoleon (ancient war hero)
 Baldassarre Squitti (teacher of law & politician)
 Barlaam of Seminara (14th-century humanist Greek teacher to Petrarch & Boccaccio)
 Benito Carbone (football manager)
 Bernardino Telesio (16th-century philosopher & first of the modern scientists)
 Blessed Camillus Costanzo (16th-century Jesuit missionary & Roman Catholic martyr)
 Blessed Elena Aiello (founder of "Sister Minims of The Passion of Our Lord Jesus Christ")
 Blessed Francesco Maria Greco (co-founder of "Little Workers of the Sacred Hearts")
 Blessed Francesco Mottola (founder of the "Secular Institute of the Oblates of the Sacred Heart")
 Blessed Gaetana Tolomeo (venerable, Servant of God & religious radio host of "Radio Maria")
 Blessed Maria Candida of the Eucharist (Discalced Carmelite nun & mystic)
 Blessed Mariantonia Samà (known as the "Little Sister of Saint Bruno")
 Bohemond I of Antioch (Prince of Taranto & Antioch)
 Bruno Amantea (physician & surgeon)
 Bruno Chimirri (equestrian who competed in the 2004 Olympic Games)
 Brunori Sas (singer/songwriter)
 Calliphon of Croton (pythagorean physician)
 Carlo Carlei (film director)
 Carmelo Zito (journalist & newspaper editor)
 Carmine Abate (writer & novelist)
 Cassiodorus (founder of the Vivarium Monastery who put together the first western bible)
 Cesare Lanza (journalist & author)
 Charles Atlas (bodybuilder)
 Cicco Simonetta (Renaissance statesman who composed a treatise on cryptography)
 Clearchus of Rhegium (ancient sculptor)
 Clinomachus (Megarian philosopher)
 Corrado Alvaro (writer & journalist)
 Cosimo Schepis (artist, sculptor & art restorer)
 Cylon of Croton (led a revolt against the Pythagoreans)
 Damo (Pythagorean philosopher)
 Daniele Lavia (member of Italian men's national volleyball team)
 Democedes (ancient physician that Herodotus called "the most skillful physician of his time")
 Dick Danello (singer & composer)
 Diego Carpitella (professor of ethnomusicology)
 Diognetus of Croton (ancient athlete)
 Domenico Berardi (youngest footballer to score 4 goals in a "Serie A" match since 1931)
 Domenico Caruso (writer, poet & scholar of Calabrian dialects)
 Domenico Siciliani (General & Deputy Governor of Cyrenaica)
 Domenico Spanò Bolani (historian & writer)
 Domingo F. Periconi (20th-century artist)
 Donatella Versace (Vice-President & chief designer of Versace Group)
 El Presidente (musician/singer/record producer)
 Eleuterio Francesco Fortino (awarded Catholic priest who improved relations between the Catholic & Orthodox churches during his service)
 Elio Veltri (journalist & politician)
 Elisabetta Gregoraci (model & television personality)
 Elsa Serrano (fashion designer)
 Emilio Bulgarelli (won gold team medal in water polo at the 1948 London Olympics)
 Enrico Salfi (19th-century painter of biblical/Roman subjects)
 Enzo Mirigliani (patron of Miss Italy beauty contest)
 Eratosthenes of Croton (ancient athlete)
 Erminio Blotta (sculptor)
 Eugene De Rosa (20th-century architect)
 Eugene Gaudio (cinematographer for 1916 version of "20,000 Leagues Under the Sea")
 Eugenio Tano (19th-century painter)
 Fabrizio Ruffo (cardinal & politician who led the Sanfedismo movement)
 Fausto Torrefranca (musicologist & critic)
 Ferdinando di Diano (mathematician, abbot, philosopher & theologist)
 Ferruccio Baffa Trasci (17th-century bishop, theologian & philosopher)
 Filippo De Nobili (writer & poet)
 Flavia Fortunato (singer, actress & television presenter)
 Florestano Pepe (19th-century Italian patriot)
 Fortunato Arena (actor & stuntman)
 Francesco Acri (19th-century philosopher & historian of philosophy)
 Francesco Altimari (scholar in the field of Albanology)
 Francesco Amico (Roman Catholic theologian, professor & chancellor)
 Francesco Anile (opera tenor)
 Francesco Antonio Santori (19th-century writer, poet & playwright)
 Francesco Cilea (19th-century opera composer)
 Francesco Colelli (baroque painter)
 Francesco Cozza (17th-century Baroque artist)
 Francesco Domenico Chiarello (Knight of Vittorio Veneto who saw action in both World Wars)
 Francesco Fiorentino (philosopher & historiographer)
 Francesco Florimo (19th-century archivist, musicologist, music historian & composer)
 Francesco Jacomoni (20th-century diplomat & governor of Albania)
 Francesco Jerace (sculptor)
 Francesco Manuel Bongiorno (professional cyclist)
 Francesco Leonetti (poet, novelist & art critic)
 Francesco Panetta (champion long-distance runner)
 Francesco Pianeta (heavyweight boxer)
 Francesco Pignata (champion javelin thrower)
 Francesco Raffaello Santoro (painter)
 Francesco Reda (professional road bicycle racer)
 Francesco Repaci (politician, socialist & anti-fascist)
 Francesco Sambiasi (16th-century Catholic missionary to China)
 Francesco Saverio Mergalo (18th-century painter)
 Francesco Saverio Salfi (writer, politician & librettist)
 Francesco Smalto (fashion designer)
 Fran Hauser (venture capitalist, digital media executive & philanthropist)
 Gaetano Scorza (mathematician who inspired the theory of "Scorza varieties")
 Gennaro Gattuso (footballer)
 Gesualdo Penna (champion senior sprinter)
 Giandomenico Martoretta (16th-century Baroque composer)
 Gianna Maria Canale (model & actress)
 Gianni Amelio (film director)
 Gianni De Luca (comic book artist, illustrator, painter & etcher)
 Gianni Versace (fashion designer & founder of Versace Group)
 Gigi Peronace (football agent)
 Gioachino Greco (17th-century champion chess player)
 Giacomo Marramao (philosopher & teacher)
 Gino Renni (actor, comedian & singer)
 Giorgio Campanella (professional boxer)
 Giorgio Miceli (opera composer)
 Giovanni Andrea Serrao (intellectual who supported the Parthenopaean Republic of 1799)
 Giovanni Angelo Criscuolo (16th-century Renaissance painter)
 Giovanni Battista Palatino (16th-century Renaissance master calligrapher whose name was given to the Palatino typeface)
 Giovanni Battista Zupi (16th-century astronomer who discovered that the planet Mercury had orbital phases)
 Giovanni De Gennaro (Police officer & Chairman of Defense Group Leonardo)
 Giovanni Francesco Gemelli Careri (17th-century adventurer & traveler)
 Giovanni Francesco Mormando (15th-century architect)
 Giovanni Leonardo di Bona (first international chess tournament winner)
 Giovanni Lorenzo d'Anania (16th-century geographer & theologian)
 Giovanni Luca Conforti (16th-century composer & prominent falsetto singer)
 Giovanni Nicotera (19th-century Italian patriot & politician)
 Giovanni Parisi (gold medal winning boxer at the 1988 Seoul Olympics)
 Giovanni Tocci (professional diver)
 Giovanni Valentino Gentile (16th-century humanist & non-Trinitarian)
 Giovanni Vincenzo Gravina (17th-century author, academic & jurist)
 Girolamo de Rada (19th-century writer of Italo-Albanian literature)
 Giulio Variboba (18th-century poet & priest)
 Giuseppe Albanese (classical pianist)
 Giuseppe Antonio Sorbilli (sculptor)
 Giuseppe Bardari (writer)
 Giuseppe Ciro (racing driver)
 Giuseppe Coniglio (poet)
 Giuseppe Faraca (won young rider classification in the 1981 Giro d'Italia)
 Giuseppe Filianoti (lyric tenor)
 Giuseppe Lagrotteria (weightlifter who competed at the 1984 Summer Olympics)
 Giuseppe Leuzzi (journalist, essayist, writer & author)
 Giuseppe Lo Schiavo (visual artist)
 Giuseppe Musolino (outlaw/folk hero)
 Giuseppe Novelli (geneticist)
 Giuseppe Petitto (award-winning film director)
 Giuseppe Sensi (cardinal & vatican diplomat)
 Giuseppe Vincenzo Ciaccio (anatomist whose name is associated with lacrimal glands called "Ciaccio's glands")
 Giuseppina Macrì (won bronze medal at the 2001 World Judo Championships in Munich)
 Giusy Versace (paralympic athlete & television presenter)
 Glycon of Croton (ancient athlete)
 Goffredo Zehender (Racing Driver)
 Gregorio Carafa (Prince & Grand Master of the Order of Malta)
 Gregorio Preti (17th-century Baroque artist & brother of Mattia Preti)
 Guglielmo Pepe (19th-century general & patriot)
 Guglielmo Verdirame (member of the House of Lords, King's Counsel, & professor of law at King's College London) 
 Guglielmo Sirleto (16th-century cardinal & scholar)
 Guido Daniele (internationally renowned body painting artist)
 Henry Aristippus (religious scholar & writer in Norman Kingdom of Sicily)
 Hippostratus of Croton (ancient athlete)
 Ibycus (ancient lyric poet)
 Isabela de Rosis (religious sister & congregation founder)
 Isomachus of Croton (ancient athlete)
 Janus Parrhasius (16th-century humanist who founded the Cosentian Academy in 1511)
 Jimi Bertucci (singer, songwriter, musician & composer)
 Joachim of Fiore (12th-century mystic & theologian)
 John Italus (11th-century Byzantine philosopher)
 John XVI (10th-century antipope)
 Jone Salinas (film actress)
 Karmel Kandreva (writer & poet)
 Leonardo Vinci (18th-century composer)
 Leonida Rèpaci (writer, poet, playwright & political activist)
 Leonzio Pilato (14th-century humanist & Western Europe's first Professor of Greek)
 Leopoldo Trieste (actor, film director & script writer)
 Linda Lanzillotta (member of Italy-USA Foundation & founder/President of GLOCUS Think Tank)
 Loredana Bertè (singer)
 Louiselle (singer)
 Luciano Rispoli (television/radio writer & presenter)
 Lucio Parrillo (fantasy artist)
 Luigi Miceli (19th-century Italian patriot, politician & military figure)
 Luigi Ruffo-Scilla (Catholic Cardinal & Archbishop of Naples)
 Luigi Tripepi (Catholic Cardinal & poet)
 Lycinus of Croton (ancient athlete)
 Marcello Fonte (actor)
 Marcello Guido (deconstructivist architect)
 Marco Aurelio Severino (surgeon, anatomist & author)
 Marco Cardisco (16th-century Renaissance artist)
 Maria Antonia Braile (writer who was the first Albanian woman to ever publish literature in Albanian)
 Maria Latella (multimedia journalist, columnist, TV anchor woman & interviewer)
 Maria Perrotta (classical pianist)
 Maria Perrusi (Miss Italia 2009)
 Maria Voce (lawyer & former President of the Focolare Movement)
 Mariangela Perrupato (synchronized swimmer)
 Marina Ripa di Meana (actress, director, writer, stylist, activist & TV personality)
 Mario Alicata (Italian Partisan, literary critic & politician)
 Mario Tricoci (hairstylist-entrepreneur)
 Marion A. Trozzolo (inventor of the Teflon coated frying pan)
 Matilde Ciccia (actress & professional ice dancer)
 Mattia Preti (17th-century Baroque artist)
 Maurizio Leone (champion long-distance runner)
 Mauro Fiore (Academy Award Winning Cinematographer for the movie "Avatar")
 Melinno (ancient lyric poet)
 Mia Martini (singer)
 Michelangelo Falvetti (17th-century Baroque composer)
 Michele D’Oppido (professional swimmer)
 Michele Pane (19th–20th-century symbolist poet & journalist)
 Michéal Castaldo (classical crossover tenor, music producer & composer)
 Milo of Croton (ancient olympic athlete)
 Mimmo Calopresti (film director, screenwriter, producer & actor)
 Mimmo Rotella (20th-century poet & contemporary artist who invented the Decollage)
 Mino Reitano (singer-songwriter & actor)
 Natuzza Evolo (Catholic mystic & Servant of God)
 Niccolò Lapiccola (18th-century artist)
 Nicholas Musuraca (cinematographer & pioneer of film noir)
 Nicholas of Crotone (13th-century bilingual bishop known for his role in the reconciliation of the Eastern Orthodox & Roman Catholic churches)
 Nick Mancuso (actor of stage & screen)
 Nick Nostro (film director)
 Nicola Antonio Manfroce (19th-century composer)
 Nicola Calipari (military intelligence officer)
 Nicola Squitti (Italian senator & diplomat)
 Nik Spatari (painter, sculptor & architect)
 Ninetto Davoli (actor)
 Nossis (ancient epigrammist & poet)
 Nuccio Schepis (artist, sculptor & art restorer)
 Occhiali (16th-century Ottoman admiral)
 Ofelia Giudicissi Curci (poet & archeologist)
 Orfeo Reda (painter & artist)
 Oreste Moricca (gold medal winning fencer at the 1924 Paris Olympics)
 Otello Profazio (folk singer-songwriter & author)
 Paolo Antonio Foscarini (16th-century scientist who wrote about the mobility of the earth)
 Paolo Serrao (teacher of musical theory & composition)
 Pasquale Anselmo (actor & voice actor)
 Pasquale Carpino (celebrity chef)
 Pasquale Galluppi (19th-century philosopher)
 Paul Néri (professional cyclist)
 Peppino Mazzotta (actor)
 Peter Carravetta (philosopher, poet, literary theorist & translator)
 Phayllos of Croton (ancient athlete who outfitted & commanded a ship at the Battle of Salamis)
 Philippus of Croton (ancient olympic athlete & war hero)
 Philistion of Locri (ancient physician & writer on medicine)
 Philolaus (pythagorean & presocratic philosopher)
 Phintys (pythagorean philosopher)
 Pier Francesco Pingitore (director, screenwriter, playwright & author)
 Pierpaolo Parisio (Cardinal who was one of the Presidents of the Council of Trent at its first session in 1542)
 Pietro Delle Piane (actor & TV personality)
 Pietro Negroni (16th-century Renaissance artist)
 Pino Arlacchi (sociologist & politician)
 Polissena Ruffo (Princess & first wife to Francesco Sforza)
 Pope Anterus (3rd-century pope & saint)
 Pope John VII (8th-century pope)
 Pope Telesphorus (2nd-century pope & saint)
 Pope Zachary (8th-century pope & saint)
 Pope Zosimus (5th-century pope & saint)
 Proclus of Rhegium (ancient physician)
 Quintus Laronius (Roman military officer & Senator)
 Quinzio Bongiovanni (scholar of philosophy)
 Raf Vallone (actor & international film star)
 Raffaele Conflenti (aeronautical engineer & aircraft designer)
 Raffaele Piria (19th-century chemist who discovered the major component of Aspirin)
 Regina Catrambone (philanthropist & co-founder of Migrant Offshore Aid Station)
 Renato Dulbecco (Nobel Prize winning virologist)
 Renato Turano (politician/businessman & founder of Turano Baking Company)
 Rhys Coiro (film, television & stage actor)
 Rino Barillari (King of Paparazzi)
 Rino Gaetano (singer-songwriter)
 Roberto Russo (pianist & composer)
 Roberto Sgambelluri (professional racing cyclist)
 Rocco B. Commisso (founder of Mediacom Communications Corporation)
 Rocco Granata (singer-songwriter who wrote the hit song "Marina")
 Rocco Jemma (professor of Pediatric Medicine)
 Rocky Gattellari (professional boxer & businessman)
 Roger II of Sicily (Duke of Apulia & Calabria & 1st King of Sicily)
 Rosalba Forciniti (won bronze medal in Judo at the 2012 London Olympics)
 Rosario Rubbettino (founded publishing house Rubbettino Editore)
 Rosella Postorino (award winning author)
 Rubens Santoro (painter)
 Saint Alexander of Constantinople (Bishop of Byzantium & 1st Archbishop of Constantinople)
 Saint Bartholomew the Younger (970–1055, abbot of Grottaferrata)
 Saint Fantinus (927–1000)
 Saint Francis of Paola (1416–1507, patron saint of Calabria)
 Saint Gaetano Catanoso (1879–1963)
 Saint Gregor von Burtscheid (940–999)
 Saint Himerius of Cremona (Bishop – died 560)
 Saint Humilis of Bisignano (1582–1637)
 Saint Luca Antonio Falcone (1669–1739)
 Saint Nicodemus of Mammola (900–990)
 Saint Nicola Saggio (born 1650 Longobardi – died 1709 Rome)
 Saint Nilo of Rossano (910–1005, founded the monastery of Grottaferrata)
 Salvatore Albano (sculptor)
 Salvatore Frega (composer of cultured contemporary & experimental music)
 Salvatore Petruolo (painter)
 Salvatore Pisani (sculptor)
 Sandra Savaglio (award-winning astrophysicist & author)
 Santi Paladino (journalist, politician & writer)
 Santo Versace  (President & Co-CEO of Versace Group)
 Scilla Sclanizza (actress of stage & screen)
 Sergio Cammariere (jazz singer-songwriter)
 Sergio Laganà (professional road cyclist)
 Sergio Pastore (film director & screenwriter)
 Silvio Vigliaturo (glassfusion maestro)
 Simone Borrelli (actor, director, singer-songwriter & musician)
 Simone Rosalba (volleyball player & member of the 1998 world championship Gold Medal Team)
 Stefano Rodotà (jurist, politician, academic & author)
 Stesichorus (ancient poet)
 Steve Conte (actor)
 Tatiana Trouvé (contemporary visual artist & sculptor)
 Teresa Macrì (art critic, curator & writer)
 Theagenes of Rhegium (ancient literary critic)
 Timaeus of Locri (pythagorean philosopher)
 Tisicrates of Croton (ancient athlete)
 Tito Arecchi (physicist who contributed to laser physics & quantum optics)
 Tito Minniti (Italian Royal Air Force Hero of World War 2)
 Tobia Giuseppe Loriga (Italian & IBF International Light Middleweight Boxing Champion)
 Tommaso Campanella (16th-century Renaissance philosopher, theologian, astrologer & poet)
 Tommaso Martini (late-Baroque painter)
 Tony Condello (professional wrestler & promoter)
 Tony Gaudio (Academy Award Winning Cinematographer for the movie "Anthony Adverse")
 Tony Nardi (actor, playwright, director & producer)
 Tony Parisi (former WWWF & WWF wrestling champion)
 Umberto Boccioni (20th-century futurist, painter & sculptor)
 Vincent Canadé (20th-century artist)
 Vincenza Petrilli (paralympic archer who won silver medal at 2020 Summer Paralympics)
 Vincenzo Caglioti (chemist & academician)
 Vincenzo Chimirri (equestrian who competed in the 2004 Olympic Games)
 Vincenzo Di Benedetto (classical philologist)
 Vincenzo Dorsa (Arbëresh scholar, writer & translator)
 Vincenzo Fondacaro (sailor, navy captain & merchant officer)
 Vincenzo Iaquinta (footballer)
 Vincenzo Lauro (Papal diplomat, Bishop & Cardinal)
 Vincenzo Milione (painter)
 Vincenzo Musolino (actor, director, producer & screenwriter)
 Vincenzo Scaramuzza (international pianist & music teacher)
 Vincenzo Talarico (screenwriter & film actor)
 Vincenzo Valente (composer & writer)
 Vittoria Belvedere (film & television actress)
 Zaleucus (devised the western world's first code of law)

References

Calabria
Calabria